Group B of the 1994 Federation Cup Asia/Oceania Zone was one of four pools in the Asia/Oceania zone of the 1994 Federation Cup. Four teams competed in a round robin competition, with the top two teams advancing to the knockout stage.

Thailand vs. New Zealand

Sri Lanka vs. Singapore

Thailand vs. Singapore

New Zealand vs. Sri Lanka

Thailand vs. Sri Lanka

New Zealand vs. Singapore

See also
Fed Cup structure

References

External links
 Fed Cup website

1994 Federation Cup Asia/Oceania Zone